Imam Hassan Ali (born 12 August 1911, date of death unknown) was an Egyptian wrestler. He competed in the men's Greco-Roman lightweight at the 1936 Summer Olympics.

References

External links
 

1911 births
Year of death missing
Egyptian male sport wrestlers
Olympic wrestlers of Egypt
Wrestlers at the 1936 Summer Olympics
Place of birth missing
20th-century Egyptian people